Ghiyath al-Din Tughluq, Ghiyas-ud-din Tughlaq or Ghazi Malik (Ghazi means fighter for Islam) (died c.1325) was the Sultan of Delhi from 1320 to 1325. He was the first sultan of the Tughluq dynasty of the Delhi Sultanate. During his reign, Ghiyath al-Din Tughluq founded the city of Tughluqabad. His reign ending upon his death in 1325 when a pavilion built in his honour collapsed. The 14th century historian Ibn Battuta claimed that the death of the sultan was the result of a conspiracy against him

Ghiyath al-Din Tughluq was succeeded by his eldest son, Muhammad bin Tughluq.

Early life 

Literary, numismatic and epigraphic evidence makes it clear that Tughluq was the Sultan's personal name, and not an ancestral designation. His ancestry is debated among modern historians, because the earlier sources differ widely regarding it. Tughluq's court poet Badr-i Chach attempted to find a Sassanid genealogy for his family from Bahram Gor, which seems to be the official position of the Delhi Sultanate. However this can be dismissed as flattery. This is clear from the fact that another courtier Amir Khusrau, in his Tughluq Nama, states that Tughluq described himself as an unimportant man ("awara mard") in his early career. Tughlaq Nama declares Tughlaq to have been a minor chief of humble origins. 

The contemporary Moroccan traveler Ibn Battuta states that Tughluq belonged to the "Qarauna" tribe of Turks, who lived in the hilly region between Turkestan and Sindh. who are mentioned by the Rauzatus Safa and Wassat as a Mongol tribe. Ibn Battuta's source for this claim was the Sufi saint Rukn-ud-Din Abul Fateh, but the claim is not corroborated by any other contemporary source. Tughlaq's contemptuous attitude towards the Mongols make it highly doubtful that he had any ethnic relation to the Qarauna tribe. It is possible that the word "Qaruna" is connected to Sanskrit Karana, which refers to one whose father is Kshattriva and mother is Sudra. According to Bhandari, Tughlaq was born in Punjab, India. Firishta, based on inquiries at Lahore, wrote that the historians of India and the books had neglected to mention any clear statement on the origin of the dynasty, but wrote that there was a tradition that Tughluq's father was a Turkic slave of the earlier emperor Balban, and that his mother came from a Jat family of Punjab, although this claim is contested due to the lack of contemporary accounts which supports this claim. Additionally the historian Fouzia Farooq Ahmed supports Amir Khusrau's assertion that Tughluq was not a Balbanid slave, because he was not part of the old Sultanate household or the nobility of Balban, and instead expressed his loyalty to the heterogenous Khalji regime through which he first entered military service. However, this genealogical link with the Punjab paved the way for several other linkages, such his brother's marriage with the daughter of a Punjabi Bhatti chief, the patronization of the Sufi shrine of Pakpattan, and the support of Punjabi Khokhar tribesmen who were central to Ghazi Malik's rise to monarchy. Tughlaq's court poet, Amir Khusro, wrote a war ballad in the Punjabi language for the Sultan, the Vaar, describing his rise to the throne against Khusrau Shah. This was the earliest known Vaar in Punjabi poetry. The later leading Tughlaq Sultans also continued to merge the symbols of the Baba Farid shrine and the royal court by weaving the Punjabi Muslim Dastar-bandi ceremony with succession to the throne.

Different sources give different accounts of Tughluq's early career. Shams-i Siraj Afif, in his Tarikh-i-Firuz Shahi states that Tughluq arrived in Delhi from Khorasan during the reign of Alauddin Khalji (r. 1296–1316), along with his brothers Rajab and Abu Bakr. However, Tughluq's own courtier Amir Khusrau, in his Tughluq Nama states that he was already present in Delhi during the reign of Alauddin's predecessor Jalal-ud-din (r. 1290–1296). The Tughluq Nama does not mention anything about Tughluq's arrival in India from a foreign land, thus implying that Tughluq was born in India.

Tughlaq began his career as a menial servant in the service of a merchant where he served as a keeper of horses before entering Khalji service.

In Khalji service

According to Khusrau's Tughluq Nama, Tughluq spent a considerable time searching for a job in Delhi, before he joined the imperial guard of Jalaluddin Khalji. Khusrau states that Tughluq first distinguished himself in the early 1290s, during the Siege of Ranthambore, in which the Khalji forces were led by Ulugh Khan. Khusrau suggests that Tughluq was reduced to obscurity for a brief period after Jalaluddin was killed by his nephew Alauddin Khalji. This probably happened because, unlike many other nobles, Tughluq did not quickly change his loyalty to Alauddin.

Nevertheless, it was during Alauddin's reign that Tughluq rose to prominence. He entered the Khalji service as a personal attendant of Alauddin's brother Ulugh Khan. At the Battle of Amroha (1305), in which the Khalji army defeated a Mongol force from the Chagatai Khanate, Tughluq was among the chief subordinates of the Khalji general Malik Nayak. During the 1306 Mongol invasion, Tughluq led the vanguard of the Khalji army, which was commanded by general Malik Kafur, and defeated the invaders.

Alauddin appointed Tughluq as the governor of Multan, and then that of Dipalpur, both in present-day Pakistan. Ghazi Malik's armies mainly consisted of Jat tribesmen recruited from Dipalpur, who fought for him in all his battles. These provinces were located in the frontier region of the Delhi Sultanate, and included the routes used by the Mongol invaders. The fact that Alauddin trusted Tughluq with such challenging assignments suggests that Tughluq must have gained reputation for his martial skills by this time. 

Khusrau states that Tughluq defeated the Mongols 18 times; Ziauddin Barani, in his Tarikh-i Firuz Shahi, states this number as 20. Ibn Battuta's Rihla mentions an inscription at the Jama masjid of Multan, which recorded Tughluq's 29 victories over the Tatars (Turko-Mongols). None of the authors provide a list of Tughluq's victories against the Mongols, but these victories probably included successes in border skirmishes.

After Alauddin's death in 1316, Malik Kafur controlled the Sultanate's administration for a brief period with Alauddin's minor son Shihabuddin Omar as a puppet ruler. There is no record of Tughluq opposing Kafur during this period. Kafur dispatched Ayn al-Mulk Multani to crush a rebellion in Gujarat, but was killed soon after, while Multani was in Chittor on his way to Gujarat. Alauddin's elder son Qutbuddin Mubarak Shah then took control of the administration, and sent Tughluq to Chittor with a message asking Multani to continue his march to Gujarat. Multani welcomed Tughluq at Chittor, but refused to continue the march, as his officers had not seen the new Sultan in person. Tughluq then returned to Delhi, and advised Mubarak Shah to send firmans (royal mandates) confirming his position to Multani's officers. The new Sultan agreed, and as a result, Multani's force resumed its march to Gujarat. Tughluq accompanied this force, although Multani retained its supreme command.

Rise to power 

In July 1320, Mubarak Shah was murdered as a result of a conspiracy by his Hindu-origin general Khusrau Khan, who became the ruler of Delhi. Tughluq was one of the governors who refused to recognize Khusrau Khan as the new Sultan. However, he did not take any action against Khusrau Khan because the force commanded by him at Dipalpur was not strong enough to take on the imperial army at Delhi.

Tughluq's son Fakhruddin Jauna (who later ascended the throne as Muhammad bin Tughluq), who was a high-ranking officer in Delhi, took the initiative to dethrone Khusrau Khan. He convened a secret meeting of his friends in Delhi, and then sent his messenger Ali Yaghdi to Dipalpur, asking his father for assistance in the matter. In response, Tughluq asked him to come to Dipalpur with the son of the Uchch governor Bahram Aiba, who was also opposed to Khusrau Khan. Accordingly, Fakhruddin and his companions - which included some slaves and servants - left Delhi for Dipalpur on horses one afternoon. Tughluq sent his officer Muhammad Sartiah to take control of the Sirsa fort on the Delhi-Dipalpur route to secure a safe passageway for his son. When Khusrau Khan learned of the conspiracy, he dispatched his minister of war Shaista Khan in pursuit of Fakhruddin, but Shaista Khan could not catch the rebels.

At Dipalpur, Tughluq and his son discussed the situation, and decided to put up a fight against Khusrau Khan. Tughluq declared that he wanted to dethrone Khusrau Khan for "the glory of Islam", because he was loyal to Alauddin's family, and because he wanted to punish the criminals in Delhi.

Tughluq sent identical letters to five neighbouring governors, seeking their support:

 Bahram, the governor of Uchch, joined Tughluq's cause and provided military support.
 Mughlati, the governor of Multan, refused to rebel against the new Sultan. Tughluq's friend Bahram Siraj incited Mughlati's army against him. Facing a rebellion himself, Mughlati tried to flee but fell into a canal built during Tughluq's governorship of Multan. He was beheaded by a son of Bahram Siraj, but the Multan army did not join Tughluq's forces against the Sultan.
 Malik Yak Lakkhi, the governor of Samana, not only refused to join Tughluq, but also sent his letter to Khusrau Khan and himself marched to Dipalpur against him. Yak Lakkhi was originally a Hindu slave, and may have been favoured by Khusrau Khan, which may explain his actions. After Tughluq's forces repelled his invasion of Dipalpur, he retreated to Samana. He was planning to join the Sultan at Delhi, but was killed by the angry citizens before he could do that.
 Muhammad Shah Lur, the governor of Sindh, was facing a rebellion by his officers when he received Tughluq's letter. He later came to terms with his officers, and agreed to support Tughluq, but reached Delhi only after Tughluq ascended the throne. Tughluq later appointed him as the governor of Ajmer.
 Hushang Shah, the governor of Jalor and a son of Kamal al-Din Gurg, also promised to support Tughluq. However, he deliberately reached Delhi only after the battle between the forces of Tughluq and Khusrau Khan was over. Tughluq retained him as the governor of Jalor.

Tughluq sent another letter to Ayn al-Mulk Multani, who had become the wazir by this time. Multani was surrounded by Khusrau Khan's men when he received the letter, so he took the letter to the Sultan and expressed his loyalty. However, when Tughluq sent a second message to him, he expressed sympathy with Tughluq's cause. Multani stated that he was surrounded by Khusrau's allies, and therefore, would not take sides in the upcoming battle. He told Tughluq that he would withdraw on the approach of Tughluq's forces to Delhi, and that Tughluq could choose to retain him or kill him upon becoming the Sultan.

According to Amir Khusrau, Tughluq's relatively small army consisted of warriors from a variety of ethnicities, including "Ghizz, Turks, Mongols, Rumis (Greeks), Rusi (Russians), Tajiks, and Khurasainis." According to Khusrau, these soldiers were "people of pure birth and not racial mixtures". However, with the exception of a Mongol officer, Khusrau does not mention any soldiers from these ethnicities. According to historian Banarsi Prasad Saksena, Khusrau's enumeration of these ethnicities is "an official disguise" for the Hindu communities that fought for Tughluq, who claimed to be fighting for the "glory of Islam". The Khokhars were one of these communities: their ruler was Sahij Rai, and their chiefs included Gul Chandra and Niju. The Mewatis, also known as Meos, were another community of Hindu origin that supported Tughluq.

Tughluq's officers captured a caravan carrying tribute from Sindh to Delhi, along with a number of horses. Tughuq distributed the seized treasure among his soldiers.

Meanwhile, in Delhi, to discourage any further conspiracies, Khusrau Khan consulted his counsellors, and ordered killings of Alauddin's three sons - Bahauddin, Ali, and Usman - who had earlier been blinded and imprisoned.

Tughluq's army defeated Khusrau Khan's forces at the Battle of Saraswati and the Battle of Lahrawat. Khusrau Khan fled from the battlefield, but was captured and killed a few days later. Tughluq was proclaimed the new ruler on 6 September 1320.

Reign
Tughluq founded the Tughluq dynasty and reigned over the Sultanate of Delhi from 1320 to 1325. Tughluq's policy was harsh against Mongols. He had killed envoys of the Ilkhan Abu Sa'id Bahadur Khan and punished Mongol prisoners harshly. He had fought various campaigns against the Mongols defeating them in 1305 at the Battle of Amroha. When Tughluq proceeded from Multan to Delhi, the tribe of Soomro revolted and took possession of Thatta. Tughluq appointed Tajuddin Malik as governor of Multan and Khwájah Khatír as governor of Bhakkar and he left Malik Ali Sher in charge of Sehwan.

In 1323, Tughluq sent his son Fakhruddin Jauna (later Muhammad bin Tughluq) on an expedition to the Kakatiya capital Warangal. The ensuing Siege of Warangal resulted in the annexation of Warangal, and the end of the Kakatiya dynasty.

In 1323 he appointed his son Muhammad bin Tughluq as his heir and successor and took a written promise or agreement to the arrangement from the ministers and nobles of the state.

He also started construction of Tughlaqabad Fort.

During his reign, Tughlaq built a stable administration dominated by Multanis, which reflects his native power base of Dipalpur and Punjab, and the means that he used to take power.

Death

In 1324, Tughluq turned his attention towards Bengal, currently in the midst of a civil war. After victory, he placed Nasiruddin on the throne of West Bengal as a vassal state, and East Bengal was annexed. On his way back to Delhi, he fought and defeated the Raja of Tirhut (north Bihar) and annexed his territory. At Kara-Manikpur in February 1325, the wooden pavilion used for his reception collapsed, killing him and his second son Prince Mahmud Khan. Ibn Battuta claimed it was a conspiracy, hatched by his vizier, Jauna Khan (Khwajah Jahan).

References

Bibliography

Further reading 
 Atlas of World History, General Editor Prof. Jeremy Black, Dorling Kindersley
 Futuh-us-Salatin by Isami, edited by Agha Mahdi Husain and was also published from Aligarh in three volumes (1967-77 ce)
 A Critical Study of Futuh-us-Salatin by Aziz Bano, Head of the Persian Department, Moulana Azad National Urdu University, Hyderabad, India
Lucy Peck. Delhi - A thousand years of building, Roli Books,

External links

 Tughlaqabad

|-

Ghiyath Al-Din
Year of birth unknown
1325 deaths
14th-century Indian Muslims
14th-century Indian monarchs
14th-century Turkic people